Enock Walusimbi (born 12 November 1998) is a Ugandan footballer who plays as a defender for Scottish League One club Peterhead and the Ugandan national team.

Club career
Walusimbi was born in Kampala.

After playing with Shafranto and Nansana United, Walusimbi played for Bright Stars between 2016 and 2020. Walusimbi signed for Express FC on a two-year contract in September 2020, and was handed the club captaincy ahead of the 2020–21 season. He won the Uganda Premier League in his first season with Express.

In summer 2022, it was reported that Walusimbi had held trials at Scottish Premiership club Dundee United. Walusimbi signed for Scottish League One club Peterhead in September 2022.

International career
Having previously captained the Uganda under-23 side, he made his international debut for Uganda on 29 August 2021 in their 2–1 friendly defeat to Ethiopia.

Career statistics

Club

International

References

External links

1998 births
Living people
Ugandan footballers
Sportspeople from Kampala
Association football defenders
Bright Stars FC players
Express FC players
Uganda international footballers
Ugandan expatriate footballers
Ugandan expatriate sportspeople in Scotland
Expatriate footballers in Scotland
Peterhead F.C. players